The B.S. Report is an ESPN podcast hosted by Bill Simmons, it features interviews with athletes, sports commentators, pop-culture experts and friends of Simmons. The B.S. Report has no fixed publication schedule, however there are generally 2 or 3 episodes posted per week.

Episodes
B.S. Report Episode Archive 2012

Most Common Guests

References

ESPN.com